The Tommykaira ZZ is a mid-engined sports car manufactured by tuning company Tommykaira (トミーカイラ) in Japan. The car was conceived in late 1991, developed from 1992, unveiled in 1995 and manufactured from 1996 to 2000 in its first generation, and from 2014 to 2021 in its second.

First Generation (1996-2000) 

The first generation ZZ was all styled by Tommykaira and Mooncraft's Takuya Yura, and did not borrow any designs from other cars. The roof of the car was detachable, with four bolts holding it either on the bonnet or on the roll hoop and windscreen frame. The ZZ sold a total of almost 220 units in its years of production. After Tomita Auto UK was dissolved, the designs were sold at auction to Breckland Technology Ltd, who created the Leading Edge Sportscar Company to market a slightly revised ZZ from 2002 onwards in two models, the 190RT and 240RT. In 2005 the scarce success brought to the discontinuation of Leading Edge, and to the production of the car born as the ZZ. The assets were bought at an auction by a car collector from Pakistan, who owns the 240RT too.

The ZZ was powered by a 2.0-liter SR20DE naturally-aspirated inline-four sourced from Nissan, fed by 45mm Keihin carburetors (Mikuni on the 190RT), and put out  in the standard trim, or 195 PS in the ZZ-S. With the 2000 update, it gained 5 PS and 5 Nm. Torque output is 195 Nm. The front and rear brake discs are both vented. Tires were 205 mm front and rear, but for the late model 195mm front were adopted to reduce lift off oversteer. The power is sent to the rear wheels by a 5-speed manual transmission.

ZZ-S (1995-2000) 
The ZZ-S was intended to be a sportier version of the ZZ. No other changes were made.

Second Generation (2014-2021) 

Tommykaira returned with another variation of the ZZ, this time with the help of a company that originated from Kyoto University called Green Lord Motors. A few companies also gave funding for the second generation ZZ, some of these being Mitsubishi UFJ Capital and Globis Capital. The total for funding was $14 million. Funding started in 2010, with a total of $6.6 million at the end of 2012, and earned another $6 million for 2013–2015.

The ZZ became electric for the second generation. Because of this change, many critics started calling it the ZZ-EV. The design has received major changes as well, with a more aggressive look. The car now stays as a roadster for this generation.

The price of the vehicle is at $80,000.

Green Lord Motors says the car's chassis is "adaptable", which means modifications can go over beyond limits of the car. The ZZ runs  in less than 4.0 seconds, faster than last generation.
At GLM's website It was announced that the TommyKaira ZZ ended production at the end of June 2021.

References 

Cars of Japan
Roadsters
Cars introduced in 1990

Rear mid-engine, rear-wheel-drive vehicles